St George's Church, Edgbaston, is a parish church in the Church of England in Edgbaston, Birmingham.

History

It was built in 1836–38 as a chapel-of-ease to St Bartholomew's Church, Edgbaston.

The original building consisted of a nave and two aisles, with galleries. The architect was Joseph John Scoles.

In 1856 the church was enlarged with the addition of a chancel, to a design by the architect Charles Edge.

The building was transformed in 1884-5 by the addition of the existing spacious and lofty nave, chancel and south aisle by the leading Birmingham architect J. A. Chatwin. The old nave became the north aisle, and the old chancel the Lady Chapel.

On 21 January 1970, it was made a Grade II listed building.

Fittings

The interior has fine woodwork by Bridgeman of Lichfield to the design of J. A. Chatwin or P. B. Chatwin. This includes
 Clergy and choir stalls and parclose screen (1885)
 Organ case (1890)
 Reredos (1903)
 Lady Chapel screen (1906);

Stained glass

There is late Victorian stained glass: by Burlison and Grylls, Heaton, Butler and Bayne, Hardman & Co. of Birmingham and most particularly a Jesse tree in the Lady Chapel by Charles Eamer Kempe.

List of vicars

Organ

The organ was built by Brindley & Foster in 1890 and is now defunct. A specification of the organ can be found on the National Pipe Organ Register.

List of organists

Mr. Evans ???? - 1864 - 1865 - ???? (later organist of St Mary's Church, Selly Oak
Charles John Blood Meacham 1888 – 1930 (formerly organist of St. Philips' Church, Birmingham)
Leonard Norman Gibbons (formerly organist of St. Mary's Church, Selly Oak and deputy organist at St. Philip's Cathedral) 1930-1948
David Bruce-Payne 1978 – 2003 (formerly organist of St. Philip's Cathedral, Birmingham)
Philip Ypres Smith 2003 – present

References

External links
 
 

Edgbaston
Grade II listed churches in Birmingham
Churches completed in 1836
19th-century Church of England church buildings
Edgbaston